Ann Fenwick (1724 – 28 April 1777) was a British Roman Catholic litigant and heir. She was left great wealth and defended her rights at the House of Lords when her brother-in-law tried to take advantage of the fact that she was neither male nor Protestant. She became a Catholic champion in Lancashire.

Early life

Fenwick was born into a wealthy family. Her parents were Thomas and Ann (Dowbiggin) Bennison. They had moved into Hornby Hall in 1735. An early picture by Arthur Devis records them arriving in their new home. Thomas died soon after it was built and his will left his house and fortune to his daughter Ann. His wife and Ann's mother was the executor. In 1737 her fortune increased when an uncle died and left her a share in the ship True Love.

Her mother was Catholic and an educated woman whose father had been a leading lawyer. Her mother looked after the property until her daughter was twenty-one. She married a Protestant named John Fenwick in 1752 and her fortune was assigned temporarily to her husband to increase his collateral. However, in 1757, her husband died whilst hunting and the property was still in his name. Meanwhile, Ann was dying of cancer in her home of Hornby Hall. However, the property was destined for her brother-in-law, Thomas Wilson, who was a Gray's Inn barrister and took his brother's surname of Fenwick. The ownership of Hornby Hall was in dispute and Ann accepted an offer from her brother-in-law in 1759. He offered to let her have the use of the hall for her lifetime, a sum of £3,000 and an annuity of £400 per year. Her brother-in-law's career went well and in 1768 he became a Member of Parliament for Westmorland.

However, the £400 per year failed to arrive on time, or at all, and Ann Fenwick went to the courts to enforce the agreement in 1770 since she faced debtor's prison. Her case was undermined because Thomas Fenwich used his status as an MP and she was a Catholic – the law discriminated against litigants who were not Protestants. Despite this, Ann won her case and was awarded £18,000. Her brother-in-law objected to the decision and Ann had to appeal to the House of Lords in 1772. Her brother-in-law lost the case and the support that had enabled him to be an MP. He was not reelected.

Religion
Fenwick's mother was Catholic, and it was a major part or her life that she greatly enjoyed. In 1762 when her mother died, she lost her good health and she brought a Douai trained priest named Thomas Butler to Hornby where he celebrated Mass. Butler celebrated Mass in Claughton. Despite marrying a Protestant, she reached out to Catholics such as Richard Challoner who gave her books.

Death
Fenwick died in Hornby Hall on 28 April 1777, leaving detailed wills. She was buried with her parents in St Wilfrid's Church, Melling. Historian John Lingard began an association with Hornby in 1811.

References

18th-century English women
18th-century English people
1724 births
1777 deaths
English Roman Catholics
People from Lancaster, Lancashire